Umetsu is a Japanese surname. Notable people with the surname include:

, Japanese baseball player
, Japanese animator

Japanese-language surnames